Broncho is a less common spelling of bronco, a horse with a propensity to buck.

It may also refer to:

Sports teams
Cleveland Bronchos, an unofficial name promoted by the players of the Cleveland Bluebirds baseball team (now the Cleveland Guardians) in 1902
Calgary Bronchos, a minor league baseball team in the Western Canada League (1910-1914, 1920-1921)
Rochester Bronchos, a minor league baseball team between 1899 and 1911, based in Rochester, New York
San Antonio Bronchos, a minor league baseball team between 1903 and 1919, based in San Antonio, Texas
San Angelo Bronchos, a minor league baseball team in 1921 and 1922, based in San Angelo, Texas
Central Oklahoma Bronchos, the sports teams of the University of Central Oklahoma
the sports teams of Bethany High School, Bethany, Oklahoma
the sports teams of Holly High School, Holly, Michigan
the sports teams of Jefferson High School (Indiana), Lafayette, Indiana
the sports teams of Odessa High School, Odessa, Texas

Other uses
Broncho (band), an American indie rock band
Broncho Ski Trail - see List of trails of Lewis and Clark County, Montana

See also
Broncho Billy Anderson (1880–1971), American actor, writer, director and producer, the first star of Western films, born Maxwell Henry Aronson
San Antonio Black Bronchos, a Negro league baseball team that played in 1908 and 1909
Bronchoconstriction, the constriction of the airways in the lungs due to the tightening of surrounding smooth muscle
Bronco (disambiguation)